Kimberly N. Ferguson is an American politician from Massachusetts. Ferguson is a Republican member of Massachusetts House of Representatives from the 1st Worcester district.

Education 
Ferguson earned a certificate in Education Leadership and Management from Fitchburg State College. Ferguson earned a Master of Science degree in Speech/Language Pathology from Worcester State College.

Career 
In November 2010, Ferguson won the election and became a Republican member of Massachusetts House of Representatives. Ferguson defeated Kenneth John O'Brien and Jonathan B. Long.

Legislation
In 2017, Ferguson filed a bill, to make it a civil infraction to intentionally misrepresent a pet as a service animal. The proposed law would carry a fine of $500.

Personal life 
Ferguson is single with one child. Ferguson lives in Holden, Massachusetts.

See also
 2019–2020 Massachusetts legislature
 2021–2022 Massachusetts legislature

References
							
							

Living people
Republican Party members of the Massachusetts House of Representatives
Women state legislators in Massachusetts
People from Holden, Massachusetts
21st-century American politicians
21st-century American women politicians
Year of birth missing (living people)
Worcester State University alumni